The Far Hills Races is a steeplechase horserace held annually in Far Hills, New Jersey, United States. The October 2021 event was the 100th running, and race day purses can equal up to or more than $1,000,000, with six races offering the highest purses on the National Steeplechase Association circuit.

Considered one of the premier social events of the year in the tri-state area, it is attended by as many as 75,000 people annually. Groups of visitors create unique and often extravagant fall picnic areas, complete with beautiful floral centerpieces, ice carvings, haybale seating, and culinary feasts. For many visitors, the Race Meeting is a tradition and a reunion of family and friends.

History
The Far Hills Race Meeting traces its origins to the Essex Hunt, a fox hunting event founded in Montclair, New Jersey in 1870. In the tradition of these clubs, the Essex Fox Hounds established an event to thank the farmers and landowners who allowed them to hunt on their property. In 1916, the event moved from the original club site to the Grant B. Schley estate — today known as Moorland Farms. Eventually becoming the Far Hills Race Meeting, the races have been continually run—with the exception of a short hiatus during World War II—on the same site.

Starting in 2000 the Breeders' Cup Grand National Steeplechase returned to the Far Hills Races after a hiatus of six years. Known for the highest prize money of a steeplechase in America, USA Today has described the race as "steeplechasing's richest race".

Beginning with the 2013 Race Meeting event-goers are prohibited from bringing alcohol through the general admission entrances, in an attempt by the Far Hills Race Meeting Association to curb excessive-drinking problems such as those seen at the 2012 event, which saw at least 28 arrests for public urination, underage drinking and disorderly conduct. The 100th running was postponed in 2020 and rescheduled for 2021 due to the COVID-19 pandemic.

Charity

The Far Hills Race has a long history of raising money for charitable organizations. Since the 1950s, race proceeds of those attending the event and corporate sponsors have gone to fund the Steeplechase Cancer Center at the Somerset Medical Center, raising more than $17 million through 2009. The Race Meeting has profoundly impacted the medical center's growth and ability to offer comprehensive, state-of-the-art medical services to New Jersey residents. Over 40 major corporations reserve entertainment tent spaces each year, with many more taking reserved parking tailgate spaces.

In 2007, The Far Hills Race Meeting Association committed a portion of the proceeds from its annual day of racing to the New York Heroes Fund, established to benefit emergency workers and victims of the September 11, 2001 attacks at the World Trade Center.

Results
All Gong set the course record of 4:53.80 in winning the 2000 Breeders' Cup Steeplechase.

The 2004 running of the Grade 1 $175,000 Breeders' Cup Steeplechase saw McDynamo, then a 7-year-old gelding coming back for his first race in 11 months after recovering from hock surgery, win the race for a second consecutive year, defeating Hirapour by  lengths in a finishing time of 5:06.8. The race covered a -mile distance and jumps over 14 fences. The crowd was estimated at 45,000.

The 2007 running saw McDynamo running for a fifth consecutive title, one of nine horses running for the Grade 1 Breeders' Cup Grand National, with a purse of $300,000. At the age of 10, McDynamo was the oldest of 43 horses competing at Far Hills that day. All starters in the race carried 156 pounds.

References

External links
Far Hills Race Meeting Association
The Hunt at Far Hills - History of the Far Hills Race Meeting
The Far Hills Race Meeting History Timeline

1875 establishments in New Jersey
Far Hills, New Jersey
Tourist attractions in Somerset County, New Jersey
Steeplechase (horse racing)
Horse races in New Jersey